The Dolly Sisters is a 1945 American Technicolor biographical film about the Dolly Sisters, identical twins who became famous as entertainers on Broadway and in Europe in the early years of the 20th century as Jennie and Rosie Dolly (Yansci and Roszika Deutsch), Hungarian-born entertainers. It starred Betty Grable as Jenny, June Haver as Rosie and John Payne as Harry Fox.

Plot
In 1904, Uncle Latsie comes to New York from Hungary with two little nieces, Jenny and Rosie who immediately take to cafe dancing. In 1912, they're still at it, but to pay Uncle's card debts they decide to go into vaudeville. They meet another up-and-coming act, singer Harry Fox. Jenny falls in love with him.

Harry struggles while the sisters' fame rises. Rosie is distrustful but Jenny dates him anyway. Harry sings to Jenny the latest song he has composed. A producer hears it and gives him the break he's been waiting for. Jenny and Harry get married but, just as success comes to Harry, war in Europe breaks out and he enlists.

Rosie persuades Jenny to take an engagement with the Folies Bergere in Paris. As they tour Europe and achieve more success and admirers, the war ends. Harry asks her to come home but Rosie asks her to stay with the show. Harry insinuates there should be a divorce. The Dolly sisters continue their tour of Europe, where Jenny takes to gambling and dates one of her wealthy suitors.

Rosie is secretly engaged to her American boyfriend Irving Netcher, who owns department stores. Now she plans to leave the act but Jenny overhears this and decides to accept a marriage proposal. As they drive away from a party, Jenny is overwhelmed by memories of Harry and ends up crashing the car. Harry, who just got engaged to Leonora Baldwin, shows his concern. After several months of recovering in a French hospital, Jenny returns to New York. During a benefit show, she and Rosie reunite as Dolly Sisters. Harry, who also performs, introduces Leonora, who realizes that Harry still loves Jenny and leaves the theater during Harry's act. On stage, Jenny and Rosie both join Harry to finish his number.

Cast

Reception
The film was nominated for the American Film Institute's 2006 list AFI's Greatest Movie Musicals.

References

External links
 
 
 
 

1945 films
1940s biographical films
1940s musical drama films
1945 romantic drama films
20th Century Fox films
American biographical films
American romantic musical films
American romantic drama films
Biographical films about entertainers
1940s English-language films
Films directed by Irving Cummings
Films about twin sisters
Films set in the 1910s
Films set in the 1920s
American musical drama films
1940s American films